Triendl is a German surname. Notable people with the surname include:

 Katrin Triendl (born 1987), Austrian alpine skier
 Reina Triendl (born 1992), Japanese fashion model, tarento, and actress

German-language surnames